Mir Gwahram Khan Lashari also (Mir Govahram Khan Lashari, Mir Gwaharam Khan Lashari or Mir Gohram Khan Lashari) was a Baloch chieftain in the 15th century. He was considered as a hero of the Lashari Baloch's, and meer Aslam lashari he also played a prominent part in Baloch history.

Gwahram was the son of Nodhbandagh "the gold-scatterer".

Thirty Years War
Mir Gwahram and Mir Chakar Rind, head of the Rind Baloch tribe, went to war that resulted in thousands dead, including Mir Chakar's brother. The war and the gallantry of the two tribal leaders continues to be a part of the Baloch peoples' history.

Lasharis defeated the Rind tribe in the war and then Lasharis and the Rinds disengaged, the Lasharis going to Thatta and thence to Gujarat and Mir Chakar Rind taking his people to the Multan region.

References

15th-century Iranian people
Baloch people
Nawabs of Balochistan, Pakistan